Kevin Rayne (born 23 May 1956) is an English former professional rugby league footballer who played in the 1970s, 1980s and 1990s.

Playing career

Wakefield Trinity
Kevin Rayne made his début for Wakefield Trinity in the 30–13 victory over Huddersfield at Fartown Ground, Huddersfield on Saturday 4 October 1975.

Kevin Rayne was an unused  interchange/substitute in Wakefield Trinity's 3–12 defeat by Widnes in the 1978–79 Challenge Cup Final during the 1978–79 season at Wembley Stadium, London on Saturday 5 May 1979, in front of a crowd of a crowd of 94,218.

Leeds
In December 1981, Rayne was signed by Leeds for a club record fee of £41,500.

Kevin Rayne played right-, in Leeds' 18–10 victory over Widnes in the 1983–84 John Player Special Trophy Final during the 1983–84 season at Central Park, Wigan on Saturday 14 January 1984, and played right- (replaced by  interchange/substitute John Fairbank) in the 14–15 defeat by St Helens in the 1987–88 John Player Special Trophy Final during the 1987–88 season at Central Park, Wigan on Saturday 9 January 1988.

Representative honours
Rayne played twice for Yorkshire while at Wakefield Trinity in the County Championship during the 1980–81 season.

Personal life
Kevin Rayne is the twin brother of the rugby league footballer, Keith Rayne.

References

1956 births
Living people
Place of birth missing (living people)
English rugby league players
Rugby league props
Rugby league second-rows
Twin sportspeople
English twins
Wakefield Trinity players
Leeds Rhinos players
Doncaster R.L.F.C. players
Bramley RLFC players
Yorkshire rugby league team players
Great Britain national rugby league team players